Leptactina papyrophloea is a species of plant in the family Rubiaceae. It is endemic to Tanzania.  It is threatened by habitat loss.

References

Flora of Tanzania
Leptactina
Endangered plants
Taxonomy articles created by Polbot